This is a list of public holidays in Rawanda. Rwanda observes fourteen regular public holidays.

Additionally, the week following Genocide Memorial Day on 7 April is designated an official week of mourning. The last Saturday of each month is umuganda, a national day of community service, during which most normal services remain closed until midday.

Public holidays

References 

 
Rwanda
Society of Rwanda
Rwandan culture
Holidays